Lycée Pasteur or Lycée Français Louis Pasteur can refer to several schools named after Louis Pasteur. They include:

In France:
Lycée Pasteur (Neuilly-sur-Seine)
 Lycée Pasteur de Besançon (Franche-Comté)
 Lycée Pasteur de Le Blanc (Indre)
 Lycée Pasteur de Strasbourg (Bas-Rhin)

Outside of France:
 Lycée Pasteur de São Paulo
 Lycée Louis Pasteur (Calgary)
 Lycée français Louis-Pasteur de Bogotá
 Lycée Français Louis Pasteur de Lagos

See also 
 List of things named after Louis Pasteur